Top Up TV Promo was a digital television Barker channel broadcast in the United Kingdom to promote services offered by Top Up TV. The channel launched on 18 September 2006, and closed on 6 October 2013. The channel broadcast a looped promotional video, presented by Craig Doyle, advertising Top Up TV's new Anytime service. The channel broadcast free to air on digital terrestrial television between 6:00 am and noon each day.

The channel was used in conjunction with MHEG generated Top Up TV Active on channel 107, which is a text-based information service available 24 hours a day, informing viewers how to subscribe, costs and other information.

A similar channel, known as Top Up TV Sampler, was also broadcast by Top Up TV between December 2004 and February 2005 on channel 36, presented by Alice Beer. It advertised Top Up TV's then-current services, and was broadcast from 4:00 am to 11:00 pm daily. However, in February 2005, it was replaced by pay-per-view channel Xtraview, before itself being removed in August 2005 due to capacity contracts running out with terrestrial broadcaster Channel 4. Xtraview was replaced by encrypted Top Up TV channels previously broadcast on the slot owned by Channel 4, of which are expected to be replaced themselves with new channels launched by Five.

External links
Top Up TV

Television channels in the United Kingdom
Defunct television channels in the United Kingdom
Television channels and stations established in 2006
Television channels and stations disestablished in 2013